Michael Porter (born 4 May 1945) is a former Australian rules footballer who played with Hawthorn in the VFL.

Porter was a half back flanker but he could also play on the half forward flanks. He was recruited to Hawthorn from Haileybury College and was a member of their 1971 - VFL grand final premiership team.

Porter was captain - coach of North Albury in the Ovens & Murray Football League and kicked 58 goals between 1973 and 1975.

External links

Austrlian Football - Player Profile
1971 - Hawthorn FC team photo

1945 births
Living people
Australian rules footballers from Victoria (Australia)
Hawthorn Football Club players
Hawthorn Football Club Premiership players
One-time VFL/AFL Premiership players